Dornburg is a municipality in the Westerwald in Limburg-Weilburg district in Hesse, Germany.

Geography

Neighbouring communities 
Dornburg borders in the north and west on communities in the Westerwaldkreis in Rhineland-Palatinate, with the other neighbours all lying in Limburg-Weilburg. Among them is the town of Hadamar, historically the seat of a county.

Constituent communities 
Dornburg’s Ortsteile are Frickhofen (administrative seat; celebrates its 1,200-year jubilee in 2009), Langendernbach, Dorndorf (state-recognized health resort), Thalheim and Wilsenroth (state-recognized air spa)

History 
The “Dornburg”, which gave the community its name after its forerunner communities were amalgamated in 1974, is a roughly 396-m-high elevation upon which are found the remains of a ringwall site from La Tène times (5th to 1st century BC). Within it lay a Celtic settlement rather like a town. On the Blasiusberg was a  worship place. The Christian chapel built there later served until 1734 as the parish church for eleven of the area’s villages.

The founding of the five villages that now make up the community of Dornburg goes back in some cases more than 1,200 years. Wilsenroth had its first documentary mention in 879 under the name Welsenderode – meaning the area cleared by Willesind – as did also Langendernbach when Count Gebhard in the Lahngau donated property here to the St. Severus Monastery in Gemünden.

Dorndorf’s first documentary mention under the name Torndorph stems from the year 772. Frickhofen (Fridechuba, roughly estate surrounded by peace) was founded sometime between 802 and 812.

In 1636, the Plague ravaged Dornburg. In Dorndorf only a single family survived.

Within the framework of administrative reform in Hesse on 1 February 1971, the community of Dornburg came into being through the amalgamation of the formerly autonomous villages of Frickhofen, Dorndorf and Wilsenroth, and then shortly thereafter Thalheim as well. Langendernbach left amalgamation to the last possible moment, the deadline on 1 July 1974. It nevertheless joined the community.

Politics

Community council 
The municipal election held on 26 March 2006 yielded the following results:

Community executive 
The Gemeindevorstand consists of the mayor (Bürgermeister) and 10 deputies (Beigeordneten). Here, too, the CDU currently holds an absolute majority.

Mayor 
Dornburg’s mayor is Andreas Höfner (CDU).

Sightseeing 

 The Blasiuskapelle, first mentioned about 803, in Frickhofen’s community area, was until 1746 the midpoint of the parish of Frickhofen. The chapel was consecrated to the Archangel Michael.
 The Parish Church at Frickhofen was built in 1732. From the original church only the steeple and the quire have been preserved. These parts of the building were expanded in 1955 and 1956 to make the church bigger. The church has at its disposal a great Baroque altar of the Hadamar school.
 The neo-Romanesque Pfarrkirche St. Matthias (St. Matthew’s Parish Church) stands at Langendernbach along with its “800-year-old linden”.
 The Pfarrkirche St. Margaretha Dorndorf (St. Margaret’s Parish Church, Dorndorf) is built on the foundations of a castle tower from the 10th century.
 The Hofhaus in Langendernbach
 Jewish cemetery in Frickhofen’s community area
 Memorial to victims of both World Wars in Wilsenroth
 Local history museum in Wilsenroth
 The “Dornburg” with remains of an old Celtic oppidum with a circular rampart
 The Ewiges Eis (“Everlasting Ice”) at the foot of the Dornburg in Frickhofen`s community area. Here air currents under the mountain’s loose basalt scree in the winter freeze moisture into ice. The air is thereby dried and warmed, rises and keeps the upper surface of the scree slope snowless. In summer the air current shifts and warm air from above flows into the slope, is sharply cooled and comes out the bottom end as a cold  air current. The good isolation through the basalt scree ensures that the layer of ice, which can reach up to eight metres in depth in the ground, never quite thaws even in summer. This phenomenon is unique in Hesse. It was discovered in 1839 by basalt quarrymen. Today it can be viewed from two man-made galleries originally built by a brewery in 1869 as a cool place to store beer.

Culture 
In Dornburg there are various cultural offerings, mostly under the responsibility of local clubs. There is also a village museum in Wilsenroth that affords the visitor a glimpse of the local history and a chance to remember or learn what it was like to live, work and celebrate festivals in a Westerwald village in days of yore.

Further reading (culture) 
 Mützel - Der kleine Hase (Mützel - the Little Jackrabbit): Thomas Stähler (2. Tenor of the „Ohrenschmaus“ Frickhofen singing group.)
 St. Martinskirche Frickhofen - 50 Jahre - ; Publisher: St. Martin Parish, Author: Stefan Grüssinger

Economy and infrastructure

Transport 
Through Langendernbach runs Bundesstraße 54 (Siegen - Limburg).

Education 
In Dornburg are found primary schools in the constituent communities of Dorndorf, Langendernbach, Thalheim and Wilsenroth. Frickhofen is home to the Mittelpunktschule St. Blasius with primary school, Hauptschule and Realschule sections.

Public institutions 
 Frickhofen Catholic Kindergarten
 Langendernbach Catholic Kindergarten
 Wilsenroth Catholic Kindergarten
 Dorndorf Catholic Kindergarten
 Thalheim Catholic Kindergarten
 Frickhofen Volunteer Fire Brigade, founded 1895
 Langendernbach Volunteer Fire Brigade, founded 1897
 Wilsenroth Volunteer Fire Brigade, founded 1928
 Dorndorf Volunteer Fire Brigade, founded 1928
 Thalheim Volunteer Fire Brigade, founded 1909

Notable people
Notable people that were born or lived in Dornburg include:
 Peter Loehr (1831–1899), American politician from Thalheim

References

Further reading 
 Randolf Fügen: Highlights in Mittelhessen. 1. Auflage. Wartenberg Verlag, Gudersberg-Gleichen 2003, . 
 Hermann-Josef Hucke (Redaktion) (Hrsg.): Großer Westerwaldführer. 3rd edn., Verlag Westerwald-Verein e.V., Montabaur, 1991, .

External links 

 Community’s webpage
 

Limburg-Weilburg